Malmøya og Malmøykalven Nature Reserve is a nature reserve established in 2008 in the municipality of Oslo, Norway. 

The nature reserve consists of parts of the island of Malmøya, the island of Malmøykalven, and a water zone which includes the skerries of Malmøyskjær and Hertugskjær. It covers an area of about 0.509 km², of which 0.274 km² is land area. The nature reserve contains geological locations with scientifically important fossils from Cambrian and Silurian, particular vegetation types, and is an important nesting site for seabirds.

References

2008 establishments in Norway
Protected areas established in 2008
Nature reserves in Norway
Geography of Oslo